The 2018–19 Ranji Trophy was the 85th season of the Ranji Trophy, the first-class cricket tournament that took place in India. It was contested by 37 teams, divided into four groups, with nine teams in Group B. The group stage ran from 1 November 2018 to 10 January 2019. The top five teams across Group A and Group B progressed to the quarter-finals of the competition.

Ahead of Delhi's first match, in round two of the tournament, Gautam Gambhir stepped down as captain of the side. Nitish Rana was appointed as the new captain of the team. In December 2018, Gambhir announced his retirement from all forms of cricket. Gambhir went on to score 112 in his final innings, his 43rd century in first-class cricket.

In round five of the tournament, Ajay Rohera set a new record for the highest score on debut in a first-class match. Batting for Madhya Pradesh against Hyderabad, he scored 267 not out, breaking the record of 260 runs set by Amol Mazumdar in 1994. Naman Ojha became the most successful wicket-keeper in the Ranji Trophy. He broke Vinayak Samant's record of 355 dismissals as a wicket-keeper.

On the final day of the group stage, Kerala qualified from Group B for the quarter-finals.

Points table

Fixtures

Round 1

Round 2

Round 3

Round 4

Round 5

Round 6

Round 7

Round 8

Round 9

References

Ranji Trophy seasons
Ranji Trophy Group B
Ranji Trophy
Ranji Trophy